"Someday" is a song written and recorded by American singer-songwriter Steve Earle.  It was released in October 1986 as the third single from the album Guitar Town.  The song reached #28 on the Billboard Hot Country Singles & Tracks chart. The song features in the 2007 film Bridge to Terabithia.

Chart performance

References

1986 singles
1986 songs
Steve Earle songs
Songs written by Steve Earle
Song recordings produced by Tony Brown (record producer)
Song recordings produced by Emory Gordy Jr.